Orobanche ludoviciana, the Louisiana broomrape or prairie broom-rape, is a species of plant in the family Orobanchaceae. It was first described and named by Thomas Nuttall in 1818.

This species is parasitic on neighboring plants via its roots; common host species include gumweed and wormwoods, though some other Asteraceae are also used. They grow from 1-3 dm often without branches. Leaves are scales and numerous. The inflorescences are many-flowered spikes that occupy a half to a third of the shoot. Flowers sessile or with small up to 15mm pedicels for the lower flowers. Calyx subtended by 1 or 2 bracts, which are bilabiate. Corolla is 1.5-2.5 cm and often a violet-like color. 2n=24, 48, 72, 96. It typically grows in  sandy soil. It grows throughout the central plains of North America and northwest into British Columbia and Oregon. Found from June through August. Listed as endangered in Wisconsin and threatened in Illinois and Indiana.

References

ludoviciana
Plants described in 1818
Taxa named by Thomas Nuttall
Parasitic plants